There! I've Said It Again is the seventh studio album by American singer Bobby Vinton, released in 1964, by Epic Records. It reached #8 on the Billboard Hot 200 list of popular albums. Included inside the album cover is an overview of Vinton's career since the success of his first hit, "Roses Are Red (My Love)".

Two accompanying singles were released: the title track, and "My Heart Belongs to Only You" (a Billboard top multi recorded hit, written by Frank and Dorothy Daniels of Frandoro music). With the exception of "Warm and Tender" (co-written by Vinton), the entire album consists of songs that were made popular during the 1940s and early 1950s.

Track listing

Personnel 

 Bob Morgan – producer
 Stan Applebaum – string arrangements and conductor
 Henry Parker – photography

Charts

Weekly charts

References

External links 

 

1964 albums
Bobby Vinton albums
Epic Records albums